Kroll Show is an American sketch comedy television series created by and starring comedian Nick Kroll. John Levenstein and Jonathan Krisel served as the show's executive producers. The series aired on the American cable television network Comedy Central from January 16, 2013, to March 24, 2015.

Style
Kroll Show is a social satire that parodies many aspects of television, the internet, and popular culture. The opening title credits of each episode feature multiple iterations of the show's title as parodies of well-known TV series title cards, brand names, corporate logos, and real-world locations, among them Absolut Vodka, Breaking Bad, Google, In-N-Out Burger, NASCAR and Game of Thrones.
The style of the series is heavily influenced by the reality television genre, although it differs in style and content from other "mockumentary"-style series like The Office. Most sketches are written, performed, recorded, and edited to mimic the frenetic pace and melodramatic style of reality TV shows like Duck Dynasty, The Osbournes, and Keeping Up With The Kardashians, with multiple hand-held cameras, rapid editing, flashbacks, cutaway commentaries, and superimposed graphics and text. Each episode is constructed to simulate the effect of "channel surfing" across a range of reality TV shows on cable TV. An exception to the prevailing style of the series is the recurring sketch "Wheels, Ontario", which parodies earnest issues-based teen dramas such as Degrassi Junior High.

Most sketches in the series feature Nick Kroll, who plays multiple characters including dysfunctional teenage dad C-Czar, aspiring entrepreneur and "ghost-bouncer" Bobby Bottleservice, inept publicity agent Liz G. (co-founder of Hollywood PR firm "PubLIZity Public Relations"), California’s premier animal plastic surgeon Dr. Armond, aging prankster Gil Faizon ("Too Much Tuna", "Oh, Hello"), nouveau riche party boy Aspen Bruckenheimer ("Rich Dicks"), Philadelphia-based pawn shop owner Murph ("Pawnsylvania"), and Canadian teen actor/musician Bryan La Croix ("Wheels, Ontario").

Kroll Show completed its third and final season in 2015. Kroll said the decision to end the show was his, and that the show's stories and characters were naturally wrapping up in the third season.

Cast
Nick Kroll as various characters.

Recurring
Jon Daly as various characters including Peter Paparazzo ("Ghost Bouncers"), Wendy Shawn ("Rich Dicks"), Coach Teacher/Gene Creemers ("Wheels, Ontario"), Don ("Pawnsylvania"), Kelsey Grammer ("Chairs")
Jenny Slate as Liz B. and Denise B. ("PubLIZity"), Ruth Diamond Phillips ("Armond of the House"), Maureen ("Chairs")
John Mulaney as George St. Geegland ("Too Much Tuna”, “Oh, Hello”)
Jason Mantzoukas as various characters including Eagle Wing ("Gigolo House"), Spit Decreaux ("Nash Rickey's Rock N' Reunion")
Seth Morris as various characters including Renick ("Pony Tales"), Bob Ducca
Chelsea Peretti as Farley ("Bobby Bottleservice and Peter Paparazzo", "Gigolo House")
Samantha Futerman as Tunes ("Wheels, Ontario")
Andy Milonakis as Dr. Armond’s son, Roman ("Armond of the House", "Roman's Empire")
Ron Funches as public defense attorney ("Bounce", "Mercury Poisoning"), therapist in training ("The In Addition Tos")
Bill Burr as Detective Smart ("Armond of the House")
Kathryn Hahn as Mikey's mom ("Wheels, Ontario")
Steve Dildarian as Tim/Steve ("Gigolo House")
Tonita Castro as Consuela ("Rich Dicks", "El Chupacabra")

Guest appearances have included: Nathan Fillion, Zach Galifianakis, Brody Stevens, Amy Poehler, Laura Dern, Will Forte, Jordan Peele, Bruce McCulloch, Brie Larson, Fred Armisen, Andrew Daly, JB Smoove,  Hannibal Buress, Pete Holmes, Ike Barinholtz, Rance Howard, Tim Heidecker, Ed Helms, Maria Bamford, Brian Stack, Nathan Fielder, Richard Kind, Brian Huskey, Dave Holmes, Rob Huebel, Joe Mande, Adam Pally, June Diane Raphael, Paul Scheer, Casey Wilson, Jane Levy, Marc Evan Jackson, Katy Perry, Makayla Lysiak, Jon Heder, Henry Rollins, Seth Rogen, and James Franco.

Legacy
Some Kroll Show characters directly influenced characters on Kroll's hit Netflix animated series Big Mouth in voice, personality and sometimes appearance. Among others, washed-up 1980s hair-metal vocalist Nash Rickey inspired Maury the Hormone Monster; PubLIZity co-owner Liz B.'s meek niece Denise became nerdy Missy Foreman-Greenwald; and Liz B.'s business partner Liz G. resembles shallow, insecure Lola Skumpy. Many Kroll Show performers voice characters on Big Mouth, including Kroll himself, Mulaney, Slate and Mantzoukas.

Episodes

Series overview

Season 1 (2013)

Season 2 (2014)

Season 3 (2015)

References

External links

2010s American satirical television series
2010s American sketch comedy television series
2013 American television series debuts
2015 American television series endings
Comedy Central original programming
English-language television shows